Andrew Moon Bain is a visual artist, record producer, musician, songwriter, and designer. He grew up in Seattle, Washington where he was very active in the arts as a youth. He was a young cellist in the Seattle Youth Symphony Orchestras from ages 8–12. He also formed a hip-hop group in high school and later an original rock band with his younger brother. He relocated to Providence, Rhode Island as a young adult and earned a Bachelor of Fine Arts in sculpture from the Rhode Island School of Design. Bain remained in New England after earning his degree, subsequently becoming an active and integral member of Providence's exploding art community.  His visual art is represented in numerous private collections, museums and at the Rhode Island School of Design Museum. In the summer of 2019, Bain did a large-scale wall installation at the Brown University Perry and Marty Granoff Center for the Creative Arts entitled “We Are All Carbon Beings”.

Lustre Kings
Between high school and college, Bain traveled the United States extensively. His travels took him to Jamaica, West Indies, a trip that indelibly influenced his life. Shortly after this first visit, his childhood friend, Corrin Haskell, taught school in Jamaica  and came back with a 7” inch vinyl record he produced. Bain immediately jumped on board to co-found independent US based reggae label, Lustre Kings Productions in 1997.

Bain spent 13 years living in Brooklyn, New York where he continued to be a producer and visual artist. He has traveled and worked extensively in the United States, Europe, Jamaica and throughout the Caribbean, which have all influenced his life, art and music.

Music production and Zion I Kings

Bain is an accomplished sound record engineer, mixing engineer, and songwriter. He is one third of the prolific modern roots reggae production team Zion I Kings as well as the writing and production duo PaperStars, both parties receiving a Grammy Award nomination in 2013 for Snoop Lion Reincarnated (album). Bain continues to make a significant mark in the genre of modern roots reggae music. He has written and produced records for artists such as Wyclef Jean, Sizzla, Snoop Dogg, Diplo, Protoje, Major Lazer, Midnite, Anthony B, Blakkamoore, Lutan Fyah and many others.

Recently Bain completed production on Blakkamoore’s third full-length studio album, Upward Spiral. As well as French/New Caledonian artist Marcus Gad’s next album Rhtyhm of Serenity (Lustre Kings/Baco Records ).
 
In 2010, Bain co-founded Providence, Rhode Island-based Rock & Soul band, Boo City. Boo City’s sound has many stylistic influences including Soul, Rhythm & Blues, Rock, Hip-Hop, and Reggae.  In addition to Boo City, he is currently working on a solo project under the moniker, Brown Bones, an acoustic, urban-folk inspired album with subtle electronic elements.

Discography

2020
 Upward Spiral – Blakkamoore
 Rhtyhm of Serenity – Marcus Gad
 Mash Down Riddim- Zion I Kings 
 Culture Dem 4 – Lustre Kings Productions

2019
 Not Another Word – Protoje, Lila Ike, Agent Sasco
 Rebel With a Cause – Pressure Busspipe
 Rebirth- Marlon Asher
 Get Aktive – Junior Natural 
 Mek A Menshun – Akae Beka
 Life of a Gheto Youth Vol. 2 – Various Artists

2018 
 Digital Ancient Dub - Zion I Kings
 Nurtured Frequency – Akae Beka
 Perfect Storm Riddim – Zion I Kings

2017
 Arkaingelle – Tru Da Fyah 
 100 Years Strong – Pressure, Stanley & The 10 Sleepless Knights 
 Dub in Zion – Zion I Kings
 Mash Down Georgetown – Jahdan Blakkamoore

2016
 9 – Jah9 - 
 Music Never Dies – Lutan Fyah 
 Lifetime Riddim – Zion I Kings
 Market Place Riddim –   Zion I Kings
 Portals – Akae Beka 
 Livicated – Akae Beka 
 Dub in Style – Zion I Kings

2015 
 Order of Distinction - Jahdan Blakkamoore 
 Lion of Judah Riddim – Various Artists 
 Nyacoustic Chants- Various Artists 
 Lion of Judah Riddim - Various Artists /Zion I Kings

2014 
 Junction Riddim – Various Artists /Zion I Kings
 Therapeutic- Ziggi Recado 
 Jah Warriah Riddim- Various Artists /Zion I Kings
 Redemption – Jah Bless
 The Sound – Pressure 
 Ride Tru –   Midnite – I Grade 
 Beauty For Ashes –   Midnite – I Grade

2013
 Free the Universe  – Major Lazer 
 Seven Bridges – Break Science
 Original Yard Food – General Jah Mikey 
 New Scroll – Cornell Campbell
 Reincarnated – Snoop Lion
 Rootical – Lloyd Brown
 Queen of The Forest – Jahdan Blakkamoore feat. Illuminati Congo 
 Songbird Riddim - Various Artists / Zion I Kings

2012
 Jah Golden Throne- Various Artists 
 Meditation – Nazarenes
 Masterpiece  - Glen Washington

2011
 Back for the First Time - Perfect Giddimani
 To Your Majesty – Danny I 
 Unto the Pure – Illuminati Congo feat. Digital Ancient 
 
2010
 Babylon Nightmare - Jahdan Blakkamoore 
 Black Gold – Toussaint

2009
 Guns Don’t Kill People, Lazers Do – Major Lazer 
 Proverbs Riddim – Various Artists 
 Lustre Kings in Dub Vol. 1 - Various Artists / Digital Ancient 
 Know the Road - Norris Man 
 Culture Dem vol. 3 – Various Artists

2008
 Infinite Dub - Midnite-Lustre Kings
 The Shining Riddim 
 Joy Bells Ringing - Al Pancho 
 Take Charge - Noble Society

2007
 Red Razor Riddim - Various Artists 
 Unchangeable – Danny I 
 Royal Muzik vol. 1 (Japanese Import)  
 Live from the Frontline - Various Artists  
 Rastafari Unity EP – Various Artists  
 Infinite Quality – Midnite-Lustre Kings

2006 
 New Day Riddim – Various Artists 
 Salvation – The Lambsbread

2005  
 Time and Place –  Lutan Fyah 
 Talking Drum Riddim – Various Artists 
 Culture Dem vol. 2 - Various Artists 
 Holding Firm – Ras Attitude

2004
 No Polotics Riddim - Various Artist 
 Calling All Jah Children - Various Artist

2003
 Fortune Teller Riddim – Various Artists 
 The Future - Turbulence 
 Alarm Clock Riddim – Various Artists 
		
2002
 African Charm Riddim – Various Artists 
 Credential Riddim – Various Artists  
 Culture Dem – Various Artists

2001
 Future Flow Riddim – Various Artists	

2000 
 Black Mystic Riddim – Various Artists  
 Culture Dem – Various Artists

1999 
 Ites Riddim – Various Artists 
 Fire Works Riddim – Various Artists

References 

Year of birth missing (living people)
Living people
Artists from Seattle
21st-century American artists